Herbert and Katherine Jacobs First House, commonly referred to as Jacobs I, is a single family home located at 441 Toepfer Avenue in Madison, Wisconsin, United States. Designed by noted American architect Frank Lloyd Wright, it was constructed in 1937 and is considered by most to be the first Usonian home. It was designated a National Historic Landmark in 2003. The house and seven other properties by Wright were inscribed on the World Heritage List under the title "The 20th-Century Architecture of Frank Lloyd Wright" in July 2019.

Background
Frank Lloyd Wright had been in the architecture business since 1887, starting out as a draftsman assisting on traditional-style buildings. By the 1900s he was a leading designer in the Prairie Style, a modern form aimed to fit the terrain of the American Midwest, independent of traditional European styles. He was also a leading proponent of the style, presenting his designs to the American housewife in Ladies Home Journal and to the architecture community in the Wasmuth Portfolio. The Airplane House is an important example in Madison of Wright's Prairie Style from 1908. Demand for Wright's designs decreased in the 1920s, but in 1936 Wright began to make a comeback with two big commissions: the Johnson Wax Building in Racine and Fallingwater in Pennsylvania.

Up to this point, most of Wright's clients had been wealthy. In contrast, Herbert Jacobs was a young newspaperman who had come to work for Madison's Capital Times after working for the Milwaukee Journal for five years. In 1936 Herbert and his wife Katherine visited Wright at Taliesen near Spring Green and challenged the architect to design and build them a home for $5,000. One of the ideas of the Prairie School was that beautiful designs should be available to all–not just the wealthy–and Wright had tinkered for years with ideas for less expensive homes like the 1934 Willey house in Minneapolis. Taking up the Jacobs' challenge, Wright designed a modest L-shaped structure with an open floor plan and two bedrooms–.

To get to the Jacobs I design from Wright's earlier full Prairie School houses like the Airplane House, he removed the servant's quarters, eliminated the second story, eliminated the basement and the hip roof. Further, he reduced the four-wing cross-shaped footprint to a two-winged L. To save space, he combined the living room, dining room and kitchen into one flowing space. To economize construction costs he developed a  plywood sandwich wall for use on this house. Rumor maintains that redirected bricks from the Johnson Wax Building ultimately helped keep final construction costs at $5,000.

Description

The Jacobs House is located in a residential area southwest of downtown Madison, on the east side of Toepfer Avenue between Birch and Euclid Avenues. It is a single-story structure with an L-shaped footprint and a brick chimney mass at the corner of the L. To increase privacy, the street side outside the L is clad in a combination of brick and horizontal pine and redwood boards, with only a narrow band of windows high under the eaves. Inside the L, ample windows and glass doors face the backyard garden area. The house rests on a concrete pad foundation and is covered by a flat roof with extensive eaves. One flat surface shelters a carport. Horizontality is stressed in the roofline, the boards of the siding, and the brick–a carry-over from Wright's Prairie Style designs.

The house's front entrance is through the carport. Inside, one wing of the L is public space and the other wing is quiet. The public wing contains a living room with a reading nook with a built-in writing table next to a wall of built-in bookshelves. The living room flows into a dining area right next to the workspace/kitchen. Behind that is a bathroom. The quiet wing contains two bedrooms, a small shop area, and a study. The house's original heating system consisted of steam heating pipes laid in the sand base that underlies the main concrete pad. The furnace that provided the steam heat was located in a small basement space under the kitchen.

Wright's design came in on budget, with the house costing $5,000 to build, plus a fee of $500 to the architect. Wright would later state, "The house of moderate cost is not only America's major architectural problem, but the problem most difficult for her major architects. As for me, I would rather solve it with satisfaction to myself and Usonia than build anything I can think of at the moment."

After construction
There was so much interest in the house after the Jacobs moved in that they began charging admission for tours, which eventually paid for Wright's design fee. However they quickly outgrew the two-bedroom ranch and in 1942 moved to a farmhouse west of Madison. The following year they commissioned Wright to build a second, very different home, now called Jacobs II. The family moved there in 1948. On Herb's retirement in 1962 they moved to the San Francisco area.

When The Architectural Forum magazine covered Wright's work in 1938, the Jacobs House generated more response than any other featured house. Wright eventually designed forty similar houses, and the open living room/dining/kitchen idea influenced the ranch house that became ubiquitous in the 1950s.

After the Jacobs left in 1942, the house changed owners and underwent modifications and maintenance techniques of variable historical value. When James Dennis bought it in 1982 the outside wood had been treated with creosote, turning it black. A multi-year restoration project began in 1983, restoring the house to its 1937 appearance and updating worn and inefficient building systems. The current owner opens the house for tours through the Frank Lloyd Wright Wisconsin Heritage Tourism Program, Inc.

In hindsight, many architecture analysts see this first Jacobs house as Wright's first Usonian house, though the sometimes contrarian Wright later said that the first was the 1923 La Miniatura in Pasadena. The Jacobs house was declared a National Historic Landmark in 2003. In July 2019 it and seven other properties by Wright were inscribed on the World Heritage List under the title "The 20th-Century Architecture of Frank Lloyd Wright."

See also

 National Register of Historic Places listings in Madison, Wisconsin
 List of National Historic Landmarks in Wisconsin
 Herbert and Katherine Jacobs Second House
 List of Frank Lloyd Wright works

References

Further reading
 Storrer's book among the references above includes rough floorplans.

External links

  includes more background, details, and photos.
 This, this, this and this are photos of the house during construction, and this has early drawings.
 YouTube: 1992 video tour featuring Katherine Jacobs
 Wright in Wisconsin includes information on occasional tours.
 "Usonia 1"  from 99% Invisible

Frank Lloyd Wright buildings
National Historic Landmarks in Wisconsin
Houses in Madison, Wisconsin
Houses completed in 1937
Houses on the National Register of Historic Places in Wisconsin
Tourist attractions in Madison, Wisconsin
National Register of Historic Places in Madison, Wisconsin